= Osoraku Kanojo wa Ore no Aniki o Neratteru =

Japanese manga series

- First tankōbon volume cover

おそらくカノジョは俺の兄貴を狙ってる
- Genre: Romantic comedy
- Manga
- Written by: Maruno Ise
- Published by: Hakusensha
- Imprint: Young Animal Comics
- Magazine: Manga Park; Hana to Yume Web
- Original run: April 20, 2025 – present
- Volumes: 3

Osoraku Kanojo wa Ore no Aniki o Neratteru (Japanese: おそらくカノジョは俺の兄貴を狙ってる; lit. "She's Likely Aiming for My Older Brother") is a Japanese manga series written and illustrated by Maruno Ise. It began serialization on Hakusensha's Manga Park and Hana to Yume Web services in April 2025, and has been compiled into three volumes as of August 2026.

== Plot ==
Youta Tohno, a high school student, has developed a distrust for women due to the popularity of his handsome older brother Rei, believing that women only act kindly towards him because they want to get close to Rei. His classmate Izumi Houjou develops an interest in him, often trying to get his attention or talking to him. However, Youta remains suspicious about her, fearing that she is just like the others and more interested in his brother than him.

== Characters ==
Youta Tohno (遠野 陽太, Tōno Yōta)
A first-year high school student who constantly lives under the shadow of his older brother Rei. In the past, girls treated him nicely, only to turn out that they were in fact more interested in Rei. Because of this, he developed a distrust of women, believing that they would continue to betray him. When his classmate Izumi becomes interested in him, he is initially skeptical, still being unable to get over his past trauma.
Izumi Houjou (北条 泉, Hōjō Izumi)
Youta's classmate, who develops a fondness for him. When he sees her talking to Rei, he thinks that Izumi is another betrayer. However, after that encounterm she lent him her favorite handkerchief, claiming she "found him". Youta develops mixed feelings about her, being in denial that she is interested in him, wondering if she would betray him like other girls.

== Publication ==
Maruno Ise created the manga after wanting to make a series about a cute girl teasing a boy, or a series about the family relations of a cool character. It began serialization on Hakusensha's Manga Park service on April 20, 2025, with it also being serialized on Hakusensha's Hana to Yume Web service. The first tankōbon volume was released on December 25, 2025; three volumes have been released as of August 28, 2026.

No.	Release date	ISBN
1	December 25, 2025	978-4-592-16017-5
2	May 29, 2026	978-4-592-16030-4
3	August 28, 2026	978-4-592-16049-6
4	December 25, 2026	978-4-592-16741-9

== Reception ==
Writing for Da Vinci Web, reviewer Chika Hara recommended the series, liking the interactions between Youta and Izumi and the warmth of their relationship.
